Ephraim Colclough (1 December 1875 – 2 January 1914) was an English footballer who played for Brighton & Hove Albion, Stoke and Watford.

Career
Colclough was born in Longton, Staffordshire, and joined local side Stoke in 1898. He played three matches for Stoke in two years and joined Southern League side Watford in 1900. He spent the 1900–01 season with Watford playing 17 matches scoring once. He then spent less than a season with Brighton & Hove Albion before his death in Longton in 1914.

Career statistics

References

English footballers
Association football forwards
Stoke City F.C. players
Watford F.C. players
Brighton & Hove Albion F.C. players
English Football League players
Southern Football League players
1875 births
1914 deaths
Footballers from Stoke-on-Trent